Maxim Staviski (born 16 November 1977) is a Russian-born naturalized Bulgarian ice dancer. With partner and fiancée Albena Denkova, he is a two-time (2006–2007) World champion, a two-time (2003–2004) European silver medalist, and the 2006 Grand Prix Final champion. Denkova and Staviski are the first Bulgarians to medal at the World Figure Skating Championships.

Career 
Staviski began skating at the age of four because his parents wanted to improve his health. He was initially a singles skater but at the age of 11 or 12, he broke his leg and his jumping ability declined. His coach recommended him to Natalia Dubova's ice dancing group. He originally competed for Russia with Anastasia Belova, with whom he appeared as the third Russian team at the 1996 Junior Worlds but they split up at the end of the season. In 1996, Staviski had a successful tryout with Albena Denkova in Moscow and he moved to Sofia to compete for Bulgaria. They soon became a couple off-ice, as well. Staviski received Bulgarian citizenship, allowing him to compete with Denkova at the 1998 Olympics. In September 2000, Denkova / Staviski began dividing their time between Sofia and Odintsovo, near Moscow, Russia where they worked with coach Alexei Gorshkov and choreographer Sergei Petukhov.

Denkova / Staviski withdrew from the 2000 European Championships after Staviski fell ill with pneumonia. During the last practice session before the free dance at the 2000 World Championships, Peter Tchernyshev's blade slashed Denkova's leg above her boot, severing two tendons and a muscle and leaving her unable to walk for three months. She eventually returned to training but suffered swelling in her leg. After she asked the U.S. Figure Skating Association if Tchernyshev had insurance to help cover her medical expenses, the organizers withdrew Denkova / Staviski's invitation to 2000 Skate America. Both Denkova and Staviski fell ill with the flu before the 2001 European Championships and she suffered more swelling but they competed at the event and finished 8th, their best result to that date.

Denkova / Staviski took the silver medal at the 2003 European Championships, becoming the first skaters to medal for Bulgaria at an ISU Championships. They then became the first Bulgarians to medal at Worlds, winning bronze at the 2003 World Championships. The following season, they repeated as silver medalists at Europeans and went on to become World silver medalists.

In 2004–05, Denkova / Staviski withdrew from Europeans and finished 5th at Worlds. At the end of the season, they parted ways with Gorshkov and moved to Newark, Delaware, U.S., to train with Natalia Linichuk and Gennadi Karponosov. They finished 5th at their third Olympics. At the 2006 World Championships, they became the first Bulgarians to win World gold in figure skating.

In 2006–07, Denkova / Staviski won gold at the Grand Prix Final, bronze at Europeans, and gold once again at Worlds. On 10 April 2007, they were awarded the Stara Planina Order, Bulgaria's highest award. On 19 April 2007, they received a star on Bulgaria's Walk of Fame.

On 18 October 2007, after being put on trial for a drunk driving case which left one person dead and his wife in coma, Staviski announced he would end his competitive career. Denkova / Staviski continued to skate in shows around the world and have also done choreography, working with Brian Joubert a few times. Staviski has also worked with Nelli Zhiganshina / Alexander Gazsi. The couple have a skating school in Sofia called SC Ice Dance Denkova/Staviski. Staviski coaches occasionally in Moscow. He and Denkova have also participated in the Russian television show Ice Age.

Personal life 
Staviski is Jewish. His surname is sometimes written Staviyski. Denkova and Staviski are engaged to marry. Their son Daniel was born on 30 January 2011.

Car crash 
On 5 August 2007, Maxim Staviski caused a car accident in Primorsko, Bulgaria, which killed 24-year-old Petar Petrov and left Petrov's fiancée, 18-year-old Manuela Gorsova, in a coma. Staviski had a blood alcohol content of 1.1‰ while the legal limit in Bulgaria is 0.5‰. Staviski's Hummer collided into the victims' Honda at a speed of 100 km/h. He had been pulled over and issued a police warning a few minutes earlier.

On 30 January 2008, Staviski received a suspended sentence of two years and six months, with a five-year probation period, after pleading guilty on all counts. Staviski could have gone to prison for up to ten years. In February 2008, the parents of one of the victims, Manuela Gorsova, said they would appeal both the suspended sentence and the damages awarded by the court. In early January 2009, the Burgas Appellate Court reversed the suspension of his sentence and ordered Staviski to serve two-and-a-half years in prison. They also increased the amount of money Staviski was ordered to pay to his victims' families—BGN 120,000 to Petrov's parents (increased from BGN 90,000), and BGN 150,000 to Gorsova's family (up from BGN 80,000). In May 2009, the Supreme Court of Cassation issued a final ruling in the case, which overturned the jail sentence and reduced the fines Staviski was to pay to 100,000 leva to the Petrovs and 90,000 to Gorsova's family.

Programs

Competitive highlights

With Denkova for Bulgaria

With Belova for Russia

References

External links 

Official Denkova & Staviski web site

1977 births
Living people
Bulgarian male ice dancers
Russian male ice dancers
Figure skaters at the 1998 Winter Olympics
Figure skaters at the 2002 Winter Olympics
Figure skaters at the 2006 Winter Olympics
Olympic figure skaters of Bulgaria
Sportspeople from Rostov-on-Don
Russian Jews
Bulgarian Jews
Russian emigrants to Bulgaria
Russian expatriates in Bulgaria
Naturalised citizens of Bulgaria
World Figure Skating Championships medalists
European Figure Skating Championships medalists
Season-end world number one figure skaters